George W. Wyatt (1848 - ?) was a teacher and state legislator in Texas. He served in the Texas House of Representatives during the Eighteenth Texas Legislature from 1883 to 1885. A Republican, he and R. J. Moore were the only African Americans who served in the House during that term.  He was a teacher in Hempstead, Texas when he was elected. He was photographed.

See also
African-American officeholders during and following the Reconstruction era
Benjamin Franklin Williams

References

Members of the Texas House of Representatives
19th-century American politicians
1848 births
Year of death unknown